Çoban salatası or choban salad (Turkish for "shepherd's salad") is a salad that originated from Turkish cuisine and Azerbaijani cuisine consisting of finely chopped tomatoes (preferably peeled), cucumbers, long green peppers, onion, and flat-leaf parsley. The dressing consists of lemon juice, olive oil, and salt.

See also 
 Arab salad
 Israeli salad
 Greek salad
 Kachumber
 Serbian salad
 List of salads
 Shirazi salad
 Shopska salad

References

Salads
Turkish words and phrases